Bhaun is a town in Chakwal District in the Punjab province of Pakistan 12 kilometres away from the district capital Chakwal. In 2007 Pakistan Railways announced the resumption of the Bhaun to Chakwal service.

References

Villages in Kallar Kahar Tehsil
Populated places in Chakwal District